Sir Sidney Harold Evans, 1st Baronet, CMG, OBE (29 April 1911 – 21 April 1983) was a British journalist and civil servant who served as Downing Street Press Secretary to Prime Minister Harold Macmillan between 1957 and 1963.

Career
Evans served as a senior civil servant (public relations) in the Colonial Office, 1942–57.

Evans was created a Baronet, of Rottingdean in the County of Sussex in 1963.

In 1981, Hodder & Stoughton published Evans' diary, Downing Street Diary: The Macmillan Years, 1957-1963.

References 

1911 births
1983 deaths
British civil servants
Civil servants in the Colonial Office
British diarists
Press secretaries
Baronets in the Baronetage of the United Kingdom
British journalists
Companions of the Order of St Michael and St George
Officers of the Order of the British Empire
British public relations people
20th-century diarists